Trachycarpus martianus (also known as Martius' fan palm) is a tree in the family Arecaceae. Other populations have been reported in Assam, Sikkim, Burma and southern China. The main identifying characteristics are the regular leaf splits (to about half way), the coffee bean shaped seeds (similar looking to Trachycarpus latisectus) and the bare, as opposed to fibrous trunk. The new leaf spear and edges of the petioles are covered with a white tomentum.

The species is named after the German botanist Carl Friedrich Philipp von Martius (1794-1868).

It is used in making Jhapi, a traditional head cover often used to felicitate guests in Assam.

References

martianus
Trees of Myanmar
Trees of China
Flora of East Himalaya
Flora of Bangladesh
Flora of Assam (region)
Trees of Nepal
Plants described in 1831